Eupithecia spurcata is a moth in the family Geometridae. It is found in the regions of Araucania (Malleco and Cautin provinces) and Los Lagos (Valdivia, Osorno, and Chiloe provinces) in Chile. The habitat consists of areas ranging in height from just above sea level to about 1,350 meters in the Northern Valdivian Forest and the Valdivian Forest Biotic Provinces.

The length of the forewings is about 9.5–11 mm for males and 9.5–12 mm for females. The forewings are brown, with grey and dark brown scaling. The hindwings are greyish white anteriorly, with pale greyish scales distally and dark brown scales along the anal margin. Adults have been recorded on wing in September, December, January, February and April.

References

Moths described in 1904
spurcata
Moths of South America
Endemic fauna of Chile